"The Pop Kids" is a song by English synth-pop duo Pet Shop Boys from their thirteenth studio album, Super (2016). It was released on 16 February 2016 as the album's lead single.

Release
"The Pop Kids" was made available alongside the pre-order of Super on iTunes on 16 February 2016, followed by a CD single and two digital bundles on 18 March, including remixes by MK, The Scene Kings and Offer Nissim, as well as two previously unreleased B-sides, "In Bits" and "One Hit Wonder". A white twelve-inch single was released on 27 May, featuring five remixes of the song.

Live performances
The song was performed live on The Graham Norton Show.

Track listings
CD single / digital EP
"The Pop Kids" (radio edit) – 3:43
"In Bits" – 3:35
"One-Hit Wonder" – 3:24
"The Pop Kids" (PSB Deep dub) – 5:20
"The Pop Kids" (The Full Story) – 5:13

Digital EP – Remixes
"The Pop Kids" (Offer Nissim Drama mix) – 6:31
"The Pop Kids" (MK dub radio edit) – 3:34
"The Pop Kids" (PSB Deep dub radio edit) – 3:19
"The Pop Kids" (MK dub) – 7:17

12-inch single
A1. "The Pop Kids" (Offer Nissim Drama mix) – 6:30
A2. "The Pop Kids" (MK dub) – 7:17
A3. "The Pop Kids" (The Scene Kings extended mix) – 4:38
B1. "The Pop Kids" (The Full Story) – 5:11
B2. "The Pop Kids" (PSB Deep dub) – 5:18

Charts

Weekly charts

Year-end charts

See also
 List of Billboard Dance Club Songs number ones of 2016

References

2016 singles
2016 songs
Pet Shop Boys songs
Song recordings produced by Stuart Price
Songs written by Chris Lowe
Songs written by Neil Tennant